Kaarle is a Finnish masculine given name that is a form of Charles. Notable people with this name include the following:

Kaarle Knuutila (1868 - 1949), Finnish politician
Kaarle Krohn (1863 – 1933), Finnish folklorist
Kaarle Leivonen (1886 – 1978), Finnish wrestler
Kaarle McCulloch (born 1988), Australian track cyclist
Kaarle Nordenstreng (born 1941), Finnish sociologist
Kaarle Ojanen (1918 – 2009), Finnish chess player
Kaarle Pekkala (1919 – 2000), Finnish sports shooter
Kaarle Tapper (born 1995), Finnish competitive sailor
Kaarle Väinö Voionmaa full name of Väinö Voionmaa (1869 – 1947), Finnish diplomat, politician, minister and chancellor

See also

Kaarel
Kaarlo
Karle (name)

Notes

Finnish masculine given names